In  Persian mythology, peris (singular: peri; from , , plural  , ; borrowed in European languages through ) are exquisite, winged  spirits renowned for their beauty. Peris were later adopted by other cultures. They are described in one reference work as mischievous beings that have been denied entry to paradise until they have completed penance for atonement. Under Islamic influence, Peris became benevolent spirits, in contrast to the mischievous jinn and evil  divs (demons). Scholar  indicates an Indo-Iranian origin for peris,
which were later integrated into the Arab houri-tale tradition.

Etymology
The Persian word   comes from Middle Persian parīg, itself from Old Persian *parikā-.
In Persian language, the word 'Par', means Wing.

The word has been borrowed in Azerbaijani as pəri, in Hindustani as parī (Urdu: پری / Hindi: परी) and in Turkish as peri.

In Persian mythology and literature
Peris are detailed in Persianate folklore and poetry, appearing in romances and epics. Furthermore, later poets use the term to designate a beautiful woman and to illustrate her qualities.

At the start of Ferdowsi's epic poem Shahnameh, "The Book of Kings", the divinity Sorush appears in the form of a peri to warn Keyumars (the mythological first man and shah of the world) and his son Siamak of the threats posed by the destructive Ahriman. Peris also form part of the mythological army that Keyumars eventually draws up to defeat Ahriman and his demonic son. In the Rostam and Sohrab section of the poem, Rostam's paramour,  the princess Tahmina, is referred to as "peri-faced" (since she is wearing a veil, the term peri may include a secondary meaning of disguise or being hidden).

Peris were the target of a lower level of evil beings called دیوسان divs (دَيۋَ daeva), who persecuted them by locking them in iron cages. This persecution was brought about by, as the divs perceived it, the peris' lack of sufficient self-esteem to join the rebellion against perversion.

Islamic culture

With the spread of Islam through Persia, the peri was integrated into Islamic folklore. Early Persian translations of the Quran, identified some good jinn as peris, and evil ones with divs. According to the Persian exegesis of the Qurʼan Tafsir al-Tabari, the peris are beautiful female spirits created by God after the vicious divs. They mostly believe in God and are benevolent to mankind.
They are still part of some folklore and accordingly they appear to humans, sometimes punishing hunters in the mountains who are disrespectful or waste resources, or even abducting young humans for their social events. Encounters with peris are held to be physical as well as psychological.

The existence of peris is accepted by many Turkish Muslims among other (Islamic or central Asian) creatures, such as jinn, ifrit (ghosts or demons of hell), nakir, div (demons or titans) and devils (shayatin). Uyghur shamans are reported to use the aid of peris to heal women from miscarriage, and protect from evil jinn.

The belief in peri still persist among Muslims in India as a type of spiritual creature besides the jinn, devils (shayatin) and the ghosts of the wicked (ifrit). 

Among Kho people, peri are believed to cast love spells, used by a spiritual master referred to as peri-khan (master of faries). They would live far from urban regions, having mastered the art of working with peris.

Marriage, although possible, is considered undue in Islamic lore. Because of humans impatience and distrust, relationship between humans and peris will break up. Bilqis is, according to one narrative, the daughter of such a failed relationship between a peri and a human.

Although peris are usually regarded as benevolent creatures, according to the book people of the air, they are credited with being morally ambivalent creatures, who could be either muslims or infidels.

Western representations

The character of the Peri, as a supernatural wife, shares similar traits with the swan maiden, in that the human male hides the Peri's wings and marries her. After some time, the Peri woman regains her wings and leaves her mortal husband.

The term peri appears in the early Oriental tale Vathek, by William Thomas Beckford, written in French in 1782.

In Thomas Moore's poem Paradise and the Peri, part of his Lalla-Rookh, a peri gains entrance to heaven after three attempts at giving an angel the gift most dear to God. The first attempt is "The last libation Liberty draws/From the heart that bleeds and breaks in her cause", to wit, a drop of blood from a young soldier killed for an attempt on the life of Mahmud of Ghazni. Next is a "Precious sigh/of pure, self-sacrificing love": a sigh stolen from the dying lips of a maiden who died with her lover of plague in the Mountains of the Moon  (Ruwenzori) rather than surviving in exile from the disease and the lover. The third gift, the one that gets the peri into heaven, is a "Tear that, warm and meek/Dew'd that repentant sinner's cheek": the tear of an evil old man who repented upon seeing a child praying in the ruins of the Temple of the Sun at Balbec, Syria. Robert Schumann set Moore's tale to music as an oratorio, Paradise and the Peri, using an abridged German translation.

French composer Paul Dukas's ballet La Péri (1912) depicts a young Persian prince who travels to the ends of the Earth in a quest to find the lotus flower of immortality, finally encountering its guardian, the Peri.

Gilbert and Sullivan's 1882 operetta Iolanthe is subtitled The Peer and the Peri. The "peris" in this work are also referred to as "fairies".

A peri, whose power is in her hair, appears in Elizabeth Ann Scarborough's 1984 novel The Harem of Aman Akbar.

In Lotte Reiniger's The Adventures of Prince Achmed, the titular character falls in love with a fairy queen named Pari Banu.

See also
 Angels in Islam
 Dakini
 Fairy
 Houri
 Paristan, Pari's Land
 Iolanthe or The Peer and the Peri

References

External links

 Epic of Kings by Ferdowsi, translated by Helen Zimmern (1883)

Fairies
Persian mythology
Azerbaijani mythology
Persian legendary creatures
Persian words and phrases
Armenian legendary creatures
Islamic mythology
Turkish folklore
Kurdish mythology
Avian humanoids